Military Law Academy may refer to:
Alexander Military Law Academy (1867–1917), Russian Empire
Red Army Military Law Academy (1939–1956), Soviet Union